Bryant is an extinct town in Douglas County, in the U.S. state of Missouri. The GNIS classifies it as a populated place. Bryant is located adjacent to Bryant Creek just north of the Mill Hollow confluence with Bryant Creek and the Missouri Highway 5 bridge over Bryant Creek.

A post office called Bryant was established in 1888, and remained in operation until 1941. The community was named after nearby Bryant Creek.

References

Ghost towns in Missouri
Former populated places in Douglas County, Missouri